Grevillea obtusifolia, commonly known as obtuse leaved grevillea,<ref name=FB>{{FloraBase|name=Grevillea obtusifolia |id=8836}}</ref> is a species of flowering plant in the family Proteaceae and is endemic to the south-west of Western Australia. It is a spreading to dense, prostrate shrub with oblong to narrowly elliptic leaves and clusters of eight to twelve, pink or red flowers.

TaxonomyGrevillea obtusifolia was first formally described in 1856 by Carl Meissner in de Candolle's Prodromus Systematis Naturalis Regni Vegetabilis from specimens collected in the Swan River Colony by James Drummond. The specific epithet (obtusifolia'') means "blunt-leaved".

Distribution and habitat
Obtuse leaved grevillea grows in poorly-drained, winter-wet areas from Gingin to Muchea in the Jarrah Forest and Swan Coastal Plain bioregions of south-western Western Australia.

References

obtusifolia
Endemic flora of Western Australia
Eudicots of Western Australia
Proteales of Australia
Taxa named by Carl Meissner
Plants described in 1856